Saline Township is a civil township of Washtenaw County in the U.S. state of Michigan. The population was 1,896 at the 2010 census. The city of Saline borders the township on the northeast, and the two are administered autonomously.

Communities
Benton was originally settled along the Detroit–Chicago Pike (present-day U.S. Route 12) with a post office on May 8, 1834. The post office operated until May 21, 1883 but was restored from September 13, 1883 until it ultimately closed on January 5, 1885. 
 Union District is a historic community located within the township.  A rural post office operated here from May 28, 1836 until September 26, 1859.

Geography

Major highways
 runs southwest through the center of the township.

Demographics
As of the 2010 census Saline Township had a population of 1,896.  The racial and ethnic makeup of the population was 93.9% white, 2.1% black or African American, 0.2% Native American, 0.8% Asian, 0.1% Pacific Islander, 0.7% from some other race and 2.3% from two or more races.  2.5% of the population was Hispanic or Latino of any race.

As of the census of 2000, there were 1,302 people, 460 households, and 372 families residing in the township. There were 473 housing units at an average density of 13.6 per square mile (5.2/km). The racial makeup of the township was 97.70% White, 0.69% African American, 0.69% Asian, and 0.92% from two or more races. Hispanic or Latino of any race were 0.46% of the population.

There were 460 households, out of which 36.5% had children under the age of 18 living with them, 72.8% were married couples living together, 3.7% had a female householder with no husband present, and 19.1% were non-families. 14.6% of all households were made up of individuals, and 5.7% had someone living alone who was 65 years of age or older.  The average household size was 2.82 and the average family size was 3.13.

In the township the population was spread out, with 25.7% under the age of 18, 7.0% from 18 to 24, 27.1% from 25 to 44, 29.0% from 45 to 64, and 11.2% who were 65 years of age or older.  The median age was 40 years. For every 100 females, there were 99.1 males.  For every 100 females age 18 and over, there were 102.7 males.

The median income for a household in the township was $77,024, and the median income for a family was $84,129. Males had a median income of $48,235 versus $37,212 for females. The per capita income for the township was $30,630.  About 2.4% of families and 2.5% of the population were below the poverty line, including none of those under age 18 and 5.2% of those age 65 or over.

Education
Saline Township is served by three public school districts.  The vast majority of the township is served by Saline Area Schools.  A very small portion of the southwest corner is served by Clinton Community Schools to the southwest in Lenawee County.  Milan Area Schools serves a very small area of the southeast corner of the township.

Images

References

Sources

External links

Saline Township official website

Townships in Washtenaw County, Michigan
Townships in Michigan
1819 establishments in Michigan Territory
Populated places established in 1819